Laraway Road is a commuter railroad station in New Lenox, Illinois, a southern suburb of Chicago, Illinois. The station was dedicated on October 6, 2006, and train service began on October 9, 2006.  The station is a stop for Metra's SouthWest Service trains, which go to Chicago Union Station in downtown Chicago. As of 2018, Laraway Road is the 228th busiest of Metra's 236 non-downtown stations, with an average of 19 weekday boardings. The station's rank is tied with the neighboring  station.

As of January 16, 2023, Laraway Road is served by 10 trains (five in each direction) on weekdays. Three of the outbound trains that stop at the station make a flag stop to discharge passengers. Saturday service is currently suspended.

The station's parking lot has 300 spaces, although there is enough room to have a total of 1200. The actual station facilities are minimal, with a brick building housing bathrooms, along with a bike shelter. No bus service is available at the station, however.

A much older station in New Lenox exists along Metra's Rock Island District line. Prior to approaching Laraway Road station, Metra's SWS line crosses a bridge over the RID line. No connection is available between either station or line.

References

External links

Herald News

Metra stations in Illinois
Railway stations in the United States opened in 2006
Railway stations in Will County, Illinois